Hanel is a surname. Notable people with the surname include:
 Birgitte Hanel (born 1954), Danish rower
 Linda Hanel (born 1961), Australian swimmer
 Margot Hanel, wife of Karin Boye
 Sue Hanel, musician
 Rudolf Hanel (born 1897), Austrian association football player

See also
 Hanel Field, airport in Oregon, United States
 Hänel